The Comfort Zone is the second studio album by American singer and actress Vanessa Williams, released on August 20, 1991, by Mercury's Wing Records Label.

Singles
The first single from the album was "Running Back to You", an uptempo song that peaked at number one on the Billboard Hot R&B/Hip-Hop Songs chart and number 18 on the Billboard Hot 100 chart. "The Comfort Zone", the second single, peaked at number 62 on the Hot 100 and number two on the Hot R&B/Hip-Hop Songs chart. "Save the Best for Last" reached number one on the Billboard Hot 100 for five consecutive weeks. "Just for Tonight" was the fourth single from the album, reaching number 26 on the Hot 100, followed by "Work to Do", which achieved moderate success.

Critical reception

Arion Berger from Entertainment Weekly gave the album an A, writing, "With 14 longish songs, beautifully sequenced and warmly sung, The Comfort Zone is less a pop record than the soundtrack to a giddy, heartfelt R&B stage musical about love — minus the man." He highlighted "The Comfort Zone", "Running Back to You", "Save the Best for Last", "What Will I Tell My Heart", "Freedom Dance" and "Goodbye", and concluded, "Through it all, the keyboard romps, the drums get busy, and a flute adds occasional breathy punctuation. Give the lady a great big hand."

Commercial performance
The album peaked at number 17 on the US Billboard 200 and reached number one on the Billboard Top R&B/Hip-Hop Albums chart. In the United Kingdom, it peaked at number 24 upon its release in April 1992 before quickly falling out of the top 50.

The album has since been certified triple platinum by the Recording Industry Association of America (RIAA) and gold by the Canadian Recording Industry Association (CRIA).

Awards
The album was nominated for five Grammy Awards: Best R&B Vocal Performance, Female for "Runnin' Back to You" in 1992; Best Pop Vocal Performance, Female, Record of the Year and "Song of the Year" for "Save the Best for Last" and Best R&B Vocal Performance, Female for "The Comfort Zone" in 1993.

Track listing

The tracks "Work to Do" and "What Will I Tell My Heart?" both appeared in the film Harley Davidson and the Marlboro Man; the latter also appeared on the film's soundtrack album.

Personnel

Musicians
DJ L.A. Jay, Dr. Jam, Mark Hammond, Harvey Mason Sr. - drums
Dave Darlington, DJ L.A. Jay, Trevor Gale, Kenni Hairston, Mark Hammond, Reggie Stewart, Keith Thomas - drum programming
D.J. LA Jay, Bob Rosa, Rob Von Arx - "beats"
Phase 5, Bob Rosa, Rob Von Arx - samples
Greg Arnold, Derek Bramble, Merv DePyere, DJ L.A. Jay, Dr. Jam, David Frank, Trevor Gale, Kenni Hairston, Fred McFarlane, Monty Seward, Keith Thomas - keyboards
Jorgen Kaufma, Brian McKnight, Randy Waldman - piano
Stanley Clarke, Fred McFarlane, Cornelius Mims, Jimmie Lee Sloas, Keith Thomas - bass
David Frank - synthesized bass 
Dann Huff, Paul Jackson, Jr., Jerry McPherson, Wah Wah Watson - guitar
Jerry McPherson - mandolin
Gerald Albright, Pete Christlieb, Mark Douthit, Thomas Haas, Scott Mayo - saxophone
Fernando Pullum - trumpet
Duane Benjamin - trombone
Hubert Laws - flute
The Nashville String Machine - strings
Horns arranged by Scott Mayo
Strings arranged by Keith Thomas
Debbie Cole, Dres, Lori Fulton, Vicki Hampton, Kipper Jones, Valerie Mayo, Donna McElroy, Rick Nelson, Tata Vega - backing vocals
Vocals arranged by Gerry Brown, Kipper Jones, Brian McKnight, Mark Stevens, Keith Thomas and Vanessa Williams

Technical
Produced by Vanessa Williams (also executive), Ed Eckstine (executive), Keith Thomas, Brian McKnight, Kenni Hairston, Derek Bramble, Gerry Brown, Bruce Carbone, Dave Darlington, DJ L.A. Jay, Kipper Jones, Phase 5, Mark Stevens and Reggie Stewart
Engineers – Derek Bramble, Claude Demers, Joe Schiff, Will Schillinger, Allen Sides, Kieran Walsh, Matt Wells, Gerry Brown
Assistant engineers – Steve Charles, Foley, Roy Gamble, Marty Lester, Todd Moore, Gary Paczosa, Mike Piersante, Brian Soucey
Mixing – Gerry Brown, Bruce Carbone, Dave Darlington, Humberto Gatica, Bill Whittington, Vanessa L. Williams
Mix assistants – Jeff Gledt, John Kunz, John David Parker, Brian Soucey
Mastering – Herb Powers

Charts

Weekly charts

Year-end charts

Certifications

}

See also
 List of Billboard number-one R&B albums of 1992

References

1991 albums
Albums produced by Brian McKnight
Mercury Records albums
New jack swing albums
Vanessa Williams albums
Wing Records albums